Hollis Queens may refer to:

Hollis, Queens, New York City, United States
Hollis Queens, drummer for Boss Hog